The Plynlimon and Hafan Tramway was a  gauge narrow gauge railway in Cardiganshire (now Ceredigion) in Mid Wales. It was built to serve the lead mines at Bwlch Glas and stone quarries around Hafan and opened in 1897, closing just two years later.

History

Background: before 1895

Mining of minerals in the hills east of Talybont in Mid-Wales dates back as far as 1698, with the Hafan Mine, which principally produced lead ore, but also copper ore and zinc.

In 1890, Captain John Davis of Talybont and Thomas Molyneux, an industrialist of Earlestown in Lancashire, joined forces to exploit minerals from local mines including Hafan Mine, and to develop grit stone quarries on Hafan mountain.  Molyneux proposed building a tramway from Hafan to the coast at Ynyslas along the Leri Valley from Hafan through Talybont to Dolybont, and then running down and across Cors Fochno using the canalised embankment of the Leri diversion constructed by the Aberystwith and Welsh Coast Railway, to a Dock suitable for coasters at Ynyslas. However the Cambrian Railways would not permit the tramway to cross its line at any point between Machynlleth and Aberystwyth, leaving no alternative but to unload into barges to get under the bridge at Ynyslas, and then tranship to coasters on the other side.  Much thinking went on as to how to get to the sea elsewhere: in frustration, Clarach Bay was considered but ship loading would have been very difficult. A tramway under Ynyslas bridge was considered but discounted due to obvious tide problems, even a line alongside the main line to Aberystwyth Harbour was considered. Transhipping at Ynyslas was discounted as too costly a procedure. In the end it was decided the only option was to go to the Cambrian Railways' Llanfihangel station, even though Mr Molyneaux had previously stated that much benefit would be lost by their not having direct access to a port.

Construction: 1896 to May 1897 
Construction commenced on 11 January 1896, but was briefly brought to a halt by the Gogerddan Estate as agreements for the final route had not been signed. Some months afterward construction resumed. The mines and tramway to this point had been funded by Molyneaux, but on 24 October 1896 he sold his holdings to the Plynlimon & Hafan Co.Ltd. for £14,000 of the new company's ordinary shares - meaning he held 46.6% of the new company, and became its Managing Director - with his son holding the post of General Manager and Engineer (having been involved for some while).

By late 1896, the trackbed of the line was largely complete. After much delay, track materials were delivered in January 1897, with the first rails being laid at Talybont on 11 January by contractor "Mr. Price of Newtown". Tracklaying progressed quickly and in May the first locomotive Victoria arrived on site. Szliumper decided to build the Vale of Rheidol Railway to a gauge of  due to the sharp curves required for the line.

Testing and opening: June 1897 to August 1897 
The first test run of Victoria was a limited success. On 5 June, another attempt was made with the locomotive propelling two trollies and pulling a third. Just before Glanfread level crossing a piece of timber was spotted lying across the rails. One of the men on the leading trolley, Richard Owen Roberts, tried to kick the timber away while the train was in motion, but he slipped and fell underneath the train and was killed when the locomotive ran over him. Three other men on the trollies were severely injured in the accident. The railway had suffered a spate of stones and timbers being laid across the tracks, though this was by far the most serious outcome of this vandalism.

In August 1897, the second locomotive Talybont arrived along with the line's first passenger carriage. On 19 August a trial train was run as far as the bottom of the Hafan incline, although the track between Llanfihangel and Talybont was not laid to a high enough quality to permit passenger services to begin immediately.

Services and closure: September 1897 to 1899 
From late 1897, freight service began on the line. The formal opening to passengers took place on 28 March 1898, although trains only ran on Mondays, connecting with the Cambrian Railway's Market Day Special to Aberystwyth.  The majority of passenger trains in the line's short history stopped at Talybont as there were few houses to be served further east of that village.

The passenger service only ran until the summer of 1899 and the entire company went into voluntary liquidation on 19 December 1899 the last train having run sometime before that date.

Re-opening attempts: 1900 and later 
Not long after closure, the company operating the Bryn-yr-Afr Mine attempted to reopen the line to serve their needs, but nothing came of it.

In 1910, Cardiganshire County Council suggested to the company that they explore re-opening the tramway as a standard gauge branch of the Cambrian Railways. However, this also came to nothing. The track remained in place until 1914 when it was taken up, though the stretch of line through the Bwlchglas Farm property remained intact until scrapped by the landlord in 1926.

Route 

The main line (which was marked by steep gradients) terminated at the foot of the Hafan Incline, while a mineral extension led from the top of the incline to a granite sett quarry operated by the Bagnall locomotive Hafan.

Molyneaux had proposed a tunnel under Hafan so to serve the Bryn-yr-Afr Mine, but this was only a dual step in the 'grand plan' for a connection south to the Devils Bridge line and the other northerly connections that were on Mr Molyneaux's mind.

Today the trackbed formation from Pontbrengeifr to the Hafan incline remains largely open and intact and can be walked; much of the formation of the mineral extensions at the top of the incline is also traceable.  Between Pontbrengeifr and Talybont sections of the formation remain intact, but others have been eroded away by the Afon Leri and are heavily overgrown which makes walking it more difficult.  There is now little to see of the former exchange sidings at Llandre.

Passenger stations 
During the railway's brief operation of a passenger service, there were two stations served by the line; these were:
 , the interchange station with the Cambrian Coast Line serving the village of Llandre (Welsh name Llanfihangel Genau'r Glyn). The Cambrian station both pre-dated it and out-lived it, opening on 23 June 1864 and closing on 14 June 1965. The station was renamed to Llandre in 1916, after the Plynlimon and Hafan Tramway closed.
 Pen-Rhiw or Tal-y-bont, serving the village of Tal-y-bont. This was situated to the south of the village, on the hillside. There was a passing loop in the station, and the railway's engine shed was situated at east end of the station. This was the railway's primary station.

Choice of gauge 
The Plynlimon and Hafan was one of the most obscure common carrier railways in Britain.  It shared its unusual gauge with only three other public railways in Britain: the nearby Corris Railway and Talyllyn Railway and the Campbeltown and Machrihanish Light Railway in Scotland.

Molyneaux's use of this gauge may indicate a somewhat optimistic idea of connecting to the Corris and Talyllyn railways, and he also unsuccessfully pressed the promoters of the Vale of Rheidol Railway to adopt the same gauge, which if adopted would have created a  system in the area to rival the  gauge lines around Porthmadog. However, the P&H's loading gauge was both taller and wider than its two northern neighbours, and so none of its rolling stock could have been used on either Corris or Talyllyn, suggesting that no link was seriously contemplated. This also meant that neither line were interested in buying any of the P&H rolling stock after it closed.

Locomotives 

The tramway owned three steam locomotives; these were:

The locomotive was built by Messrs John Slee & Co of Earlestown; it was the only locomotive that company made. The locomotive originally had four cylinders, but two were later disconnected as the boiler could not supply enough steam to power four. Victoria was delivered to Llanfihangel on 12 May 1897. The locomotive did not run well and is not known to have ever run in revenue-earning service. Its intended duties on the main line were taken over by Talybont.

The locomotive was originally intended for a customer in Brazil, who cancelled the order. Talybont worked the main line from Llanfihangel via Talybont to the foot of the Hafan incline. The locomotive was repurchased by Bagnall after the line closed, who regauged it for sale to the -gauge Vale of Rheidol Railway, where the locomotive became their No.3 Rheidol. It continued to work on that railway until 1924, when it was scrapped.

 Hafan, an  also built by Bagnall, carrying the works number 1510. Hafan ran on the quarry section above the Hafan incline. After several further reservoir construction contracts she was last noted working at the Bedley Timber Company at Nairn, Scotland in 1920.

Passenger Carriage 

The tramway had only one passenger carriage, a rather ornate vehicle with end balconies and clerestory roof. After the tramway closed the coach was transported to Llanbadarn Fawr near Aberystwyth for use as a summer house, but decayed many years ago. A replica has been built and is running on the Launceston Steam Railway.

Goods Vehicles 

Some of the tramway's wagons accompanied "Talybont" to the Vale of Rheidol, and, much rebuilt, remain there to this day.

See also 
List of 2 ft 3 in gauge railways
 British narrow gauge railways

References

Bibliography

External links 

 A photo tour of the remains of the tramway in 2004
 The tramway's entry on the National Monuments Record of Wales' website
 Items related to the tramway in the Narrow Gauge Railway Museum's collection

Plynlimon and Hafan Tramway
2 ft 3 in gauge railways in Wales
Closed railway lines in Wales
Railway lines opened in 1897
Railway companies disestablished in 1899
Railway lines closed in 1899
Railway inclines in Wales
Narrow gauge railways in Ceredigion